Rhode Island elected its members August 30, 1825 after the term began but before the new Congress convened.  Rhode Island law required a candidate receive votes from a majority of voters for election, as only one candidate received a majority in this election, a second election was held for the remaining seat.

See also 
 1824 and 1825 United States House of Representatives elections
 List of United States representatives from Rhode Island

1825
Rhode Island
United States House of Representatives